The 2014 World Under-17 Hockey Challenge was an ice hockey tournament held in Sydney, North Sydney and Port Hawkesbury, Nova Scotia, Canada between December 29, 2013 and January 4, 2014.  The World Under-17 Hockey Challenge is held by Hockey Canada annually to showcase young hockey talent from across Canada and other strong hockey countries.  The primary venues used for the tournament are the Centre 200 and the Emera Centre Northside in Sydney and the Civic Centre in Port Hawkesbury.

Challenge results

Preliminary round

Group A

Results

Group B

Results

Final round

Semifinals

9th place game

7th place game

5th place game

Bronze medal game

Gold medal game

Final standings

Statistics

Scoring leaders

Goaltending leaders
(Minimum 60 minutes played)

See also
World U-17 Hockey Challenge
2014 IIHF World U18 Championships
2014 World Junior Ice Hockey Championships
Emera Centre Northside

References

External links

U-17
U-17
U-17
U-17
U-17
U-17
World U-17 Hockey Challenge
Ice hockey in Nova Scotia
2014 in Nova Scotia